The 1982–83 Oklahoma State Cowboys basketball team represented Oklahoma State University as a member of the Big Eight Conference during the 1982–83 NCAA Division I men's basketball season. The team was led by fourth-year head coach Paul Hansen and played their home games at Gallagher-Iba Arena. The Cowboys finished with a record of 24–7 (9–5 Big Eight) to finish tied for third in the Big Eight regular season standings.

Oklahoma State won the Big Eight tournament by prevailing over Missouri in double overtime in the championship game. The Cowboys received an automatic bid to the NCAA tournament as No. 5 seed in the West region, making their first appearance in the NCAA Tournament since 1965. The team was upset by No. 12 seed Princeton in the opening round.

Roster

Source:

Schedule and results

|-
!colspan=9 style=| Regular season

|-
!colspan=9 style=| Big Eight tournament

|-
!colspan=9 style=| NCAA tournament

Rankings

References

Oklahoma State Cowboys basketball seasons
Oklahoma State
1982 in sports in Oklahoma
1983 in sports in Oklahoma
Oklahoma State